Anarhichas orientalis, the Bering wolffish, is a marine fish in the family Anarhichadidae, the "wolffish".

Description
The Bering wolffish has an elongate and laterally compressed body, with a thin caudal peduncle. It has a steep snout, and, like other wolffish, has long, canine teeth that protrude out past the tips of the jaws.

It can grow to 112 cm and 15 kg in weight, is dark brown in colour and lacks any distinct markings other than some slight blotching or palish marbling. The head of juveniles may have multiple dark spots and four to five dark coloured longitudinal stripes on the upper body.

The head length is approximately 19 to 21 percent of the total body length.

This species differs from the five other species in the genus in having at least 53 anal rays, 81 to 86 dorsal fin spines, and more rounded, deeper caudal fins.

Distribution
The Bering wolffish species has an inconsistent distribution. It is found from the Northeastern Pacific Ocean from Hokkaido to the Sea of Okhotsk, to Alaska. Although insufficiently documented, it is also known to occur across the Northwestern Pacific, the Bering Sea and Arctic Ocean.

Habitat
The Bering wolffish lives on rocky, gravel and sandy substrates, and algae-encrusted bottoms in shallow, inshore locations. The Bering wolffish resides in depths of 1-2 to 10-50 meters.

Behaviour

Bering wolffishes are known to practice nesting habits. They produce very big eggs which hatch into larvae remaining in the pelagic zone.

Diet
Benthic invertebrates such as crabs and molluscs.

References

Further reading
Fruge, D.J., and Wiswar, D.W. 1991. First records of the Bering Wolffish, Anarhichas orientalis, for the Alaskan Beaufort Sea. Canadian Field-Naturalist 105(1):107-109.
Kobayashi, K. 1961. Young of the wolf-fish Anarhichas orientalis Pallas. Bulletin of the Faculty of Fisheries, Hokkaido University, 12(1): 1-4.
Smith, T.G. 1977. The Wolffish, cf. Anarhichas orientalis, new to the Amundsen Gulf Area, Northwest Territories, and a probable prey of the Ringed Seal. Canadian Field-Naturalist 91(3):288.
Houston, J., and D.E. McAllister. 1990. Status of the Bering Wolffish, Anarhichas orientalis, in Canada. Canadian Field-Naturalist 104 (1): 20-23.

External links
 Illustration

orientalis
Taxa named by Peter Simon Pallas
Fish described in 1814
Articles containing video clips